The 1993 European Athletics Junior Championships was the twelfth edition of the biennial athletics competition for European athletes aged under twenty. It was held in San Sebastián, Spain between 29 July and 1 August.

Men's results

Women's results

Medal table

References

Results
European Junior Championships 1993. World Junior Athletics History. Retrieved on 2013-05-23.

European Athletics U20 Championships
International athletics competitions hosted by Spain
European Junior
European Athletics Junior Championships
1993 in youth sport
Sport in San Sebastián